Enhanced Forward Presence (EFP) is a NATO-allied forward-deployed defense and deterrence military force in Central and Northern Europe. This posture in Central Europe through Poland and Northern Europe through Estonia, Latvia, and Lithuania, is in place in order to protect and reassure the security of NATO's Central and Northern European member states on NATO's eastern flank.

Following Russia's invasion of Crimea, NATO's member states agreed at the 2016 Warsaw summit to forward deploy four multinational battalion battle groups to areas most likely to be attacked.

The numbers involved, although a notable supplement to the armed forces of the country being defended, are limited so that they avoid seeming to threaten Russia. The chief value of the force is that it is impossible to invade Poland or the Baltic States without battling the soldiers and firing on the flags of the involved NATO states, giving cause for war. It is believed that the prospect of war with all those countries will deter aggression.

The four multinational battalion battle groups are based in Estonia, Latvia, Lithuania, and Poland, and led by the United Kingdom, Canada, Germany, and the United States:

With the invasion and ongoing war in Ukraine, NATO has established four more multinational battalion battle groups in Bulgaria, Hungary, Romania, and Slovakia.

The troops serving in the multinational battalion battle groups rotate every six months and train and operate with their host nations' militaries.

Estonian multinational battalion battle group

Belgium 
The Belgian Army contributes a 269-soldier strong Belgian Land Component armoured infantry company from the Chasseurs Ardennais with support elements and HQ staff officers.

Denmark and Iceland 
Additionally the Danish Army will deploy a mechanized force by 2018 at the latest.  Three brigade HQ support personnel from the Royal Danish Army and 1 strategic communications civilian from the Icelandic defence forces have also been stationed in Estonia.

France 
The British unit will be supported by a mixed battle group from the French Army's 9th Light Armoured Marine Brigade consisting of a mechanized infantry company from the 2nd Marine Infantry Regiment equipped with VBCI infantry fighting vehicles, artillery from the 11th Marine Artillery Regiment equipped with CAESAR self-propelled howitzers, and combat engineers from the 6th Engineer Regiment, with a company of Leclerc main battle tanks from the 7th Armoured Brigade's 1st Chasseurs Regiment attached for the deployment.

United Kingdom 
The United Kingdom under Operation Cabrit deployed 800 personnel from the British Army's 20th Armoured Brigade Combat Team:

 5th Battalion of The Rifles with Warrior infantry fighting vehicles 
 and the Queen's Royal Hussars with Challenger 2 main battle tanks. 
 Artillery, an armoured engineer squadron, logistics specialists and reconnaissance assets will be attached to the British contingent.

The British Army's 5th Battalion, The Rifles battlegroup, rotated back to the United Kingdom in November 2017 and was replaced by a battlegroup formed around the 1st Battalion, Royal Welsh.

During 2022 between March and June Exercise Spring Storm took place which brought AgustaWestland Apache AH.1's and AgustaWestland Wildcat AH.1's to Estonia and other Eastern European countries.

As part of Aviation Task Force 3 under Operation Peleda, Chinook HC.5/6s from No. 27 Squadron RAF were deployed to Amari Air Base between 8 July and September 2022, they were supported by the Joint Helicopter Support Squadron, Tactical Supply Wing RAF and 244 Signal Squadron (Air Support) (of 30 Signal Regiment).

Latvian multinational battalion battle group 

The Latvian multinational battalion battle group is based at Camp Adazi, near the Latvian capital of Riga, and contains approximately 1,500 personnel.

Albania 
Albania will send a small detachment of 21 EOD engineers from the Albanian Land Force.

Canada 
Canada provides the core of the NATO battle group in Latvia with approximately 540 mechanized infantry and supporting troops. This contingent is provided by Canada's high-readiness brigade, a task which rotates annually amongst the three Regular Force brigades of the country. Reservists from more than 100 units across Canada have provided several augmentees to each rotation.

2017 
In 2017, the contingent was provided by 1 Canadian Mechanized Brigade Group in Western Canada, which handed over to 2 Canadian Mechanized Brigade Group in Eastern Canada in 2018. The 2nd Battalion, Royal Canadian Regiment (RCR), based in CFB Gagetown, rotated in to relieve the 1st Battalion, Princess Patricia's Canadian Light Infantry (PPCLI).

2018 
In June 2018, the 2nd Battalion RCR was replaced by the 1st Battalion RCR, based out of Petawawa, Ontario.

2019 
In January 2019, Canada's French-speaking mechanized brigade from Quebec, (5 Canadian Mechanized Brigade Group), took on the task. The commanding officer, Lieutenant-Colonel Sauvé, and most of the soldiers were from the 2nd Battalion of the Royal 22e Régiment (2R22eR) or the armoured 12e Régiment blindé du Canada (12e RBC). In accordance with this rotation cycle, they were replaced in July 2019 by the 2nd Battalion PPCLI from the 1st Canadian Mechanized Brigade Group.

2020 
In January 2020, a battle group led by Lord Strathcona's Horse (Royal Canadians), of the 1st Canadian Mechanized Brigade Group, rotated in to Latvia, and was replaced by a battle group led by the 2nd Battalion RCR.

2021 
In January 2021, a battle group led by the Royal Canadian Dragoons, of 2 Canadian Mechanized Brigade Group, relieved the 2nd Battalion RCR.

Czech Republic 
The Czech Republic provides a mortar platoon of 55 soldiers.

Denmark 
In April 2022, the first part of a force consisting of about 750 Danish soldiers, along with armoured vehicles, arrived in Latvia.

Italy 
Italy will provide an Italian Army mechanized Infantry company with Freccia and Dardo infantry fighting vehicles. Recently the Italian Army has reinforced its presence with 8 Ariete main battle tanks.

Montenegro 
Montenegro provides a reconnaissance squad.

Poland 
Poland provides an armored company with PT-91 Twardy main battle tanks.

Slovenia 
Slovenia will deploy an Infantry reconnaissance platoon, Tactical Air Control Party (TACP) team, Contribution to battlegroup headquarters, Support elements of the Slovenian Armed Forces.

Slovakia 
Slovakia will deploy an armored infantry company consisting of 150 troops from 11th Mechanized Battalion starting in second half of 2018. The Slovak force contribution consists of:

 a Mechanised Company on BMP2, 
 Command and Control Element, 
 Military Police team, 
 Repairs and Operation Platoon as a support element 
 and a team of medics.

Spain 
Spain will dispatch a reinforced armored infantry company consisting of around 350 troops from the 11th Mechanized Infantry Brigade "Extremadura". The Spanish contingent will include 6 Leopard 2E main battle tanks from the I/16th Tank Battalion "Mérida" of the 16th Armored Regiment "Castilla" and 15 Pizarro infantry fighting vehicles from the I/6th Mechanized Infantry Battalion "Cantabria" of the 6th Infantry Regiment "Saboya".

Battle Group Lithuania 
The Lithuania multinational battalion battle group is under the command of the Mechanised Infantry Brigade Iron Wolf of the Lithuanian Land Forces and based in Rukla. The battalion has a headquarters company, three to four combat companies and various support units. The battle group is led by Germany. Each rotation lasts six months.

Belgium and Luxembourg

2017 
The Belgian Army sent a logistic support company, which arrived in Lithuania on 24 January 2017. The 100 men from the 18th Logistics Battalion and 29th Logistics Battalion of the Belgian Land Component with medical and military police units attached arrived by ferry in Klaipėda and contain a small detachment of troops from the Luxembourg Army, which brought with them around ten transport trucks.

Czech Republic 
In July 2018, Czechia provided EFP Lithuania the 1st Company Task Force consisting of a mechanized company with Pandur armored vehicles reinforced by an engineer platoon, a logistics unit and a medical element reaching a total of 230 people. After six months, they were replaced by the 2nd Task Force for the next half-year. Both task forces consisted of the 's soldiers. After deployment, the company task force returned to the Czech Republic in July 2019. From then on until 2021, Czech Army sent four electronic warfare task forces. Since July 2021, an anti-aircraft missile battery from the 252nd Anti-Aircraft Missile Section (sub-unit of the ) armed with RBS 70 has been operating in Lithuania.

France 
Some 200 soldiers from 5th Dragoon Regiment of the French Army have arrived to Rukla on 3 July 2020, staying there for 6 months until the end of December, with a hundred more administration and logistics personnel. The troops form a mechanised infantry company and are reinforced with 5 Leclerc tanks and 14 VBCI IFVs.

Germany 
Equipped with Marder infantry fighting vehicles the battalion will be augmented with Leopard 2A6 main battle tanks from the 104th Tank Battalion, PzH 2000 self-propelled artillery from the 131st Artillery Battalion engineers from the 4th Armored Engineer Battalion and troops from the 4th Supply Battalion.

Norway

2018-2019 
From January to June 2018 about 30 soldiers deployed from the Intelligence Battalion's long-range reconnaissance patrol squadron.

2019-2021 
From July 2019 troops from the Telemark Battalion and the Armoured Battalion are alternating on deploying an armoured infantry company with IFVs and MBTs consisting of 120-140 soldiers.

2022 
From January 2022 2nd Battalion contributes a mechanized company with a tank capacity of about 140 personnel

The Norwegian Government said in February 2022 that it will increase its contribution with up to 60 soldiers due to the 2021–2022 Russo-Ukrainian crisis. In June 2022 the Government extended Norway's contribution in Lithuania until 2023 due to the war in Ukraine.

In August 2022 the taskforce was increased by a platoon from Telemark Battalion, bringing the total number of troops up to ca. 200.

Battle Group Poland 

The Poland-based multinational battalion Battle Group, known as Battle Group Poland (BGPOL), is currently led by the United States Army's 2nd ("Cougars") Squadron, 2nd Cavalry Regiment (United States) headquartered in Rose Barracks, Germany. 
The Battle Group consists of a US combined-arms battalion, a Sabre Squadron from the Royal Scots Dragoon Guards, a Croatian rocket artillery battery, and an ADA company from the Romanian Army.

The Battle Group is attached to the Polish Army's 15th Mechanized Brigade and based in Orzysz located south of Kaliningrad Oblast and 120 kilometers away from the Suwałki Gap.

Incidents 
In June 2021, around 30 German soldiers were recalled from service in Lithuania after they were accused of making racist and anti-Semitic remarks and of sexual violence.

References

External links
NATO’s Enhanced Forward Presence nato.int, May 2017
Overview of the EFP on the Ministry of Foreign Affairs of Latvia website

NATO
Military units and formations established in 2016
Estonia–United Kingdom relations
Poland–United Kingdom relations